Mathew Gerrard L'Estrange (7 November 1917 – 5 April 1996) was an Irish Fine Gael politician who served as Government Chief Whip and Minister of State at the Department of Defence from June 1981 to November 1981. He served as a Teachta Dála (TD) for the Longford–Westmeath from 1965 to 1987, a Member of the European Parliament (MEP) for the Oireachtas from 1973 to 1979 and a Senator for the Administrative Panel from 1954 to 1965.

Political career
L'Estrange was elected to Westmeath County Council in 1942, and served on that body until 1981. He was cathaoirleach of the council for three years from 1959 to 1961 and served on virtually all the subsidiary and other bodies to which the council made appointments. He was chairman of the General Council of County Councils (Ireland) on three occasions, now known as the Association of County and City Councils.
 
L'Estrange was an unsuccessful Clann na Talmhan candidate for Dáil Éireann at the 1944 general election. He later joined Fine Gael and ran as their candidate at the 1948 general election, but was again unsuccessful. In 1954, he secured election to the 8th Seanad as a Senator for the Administrative Panel. He was re-elected in 1957 to 9th Seanad, and in 1961 to 10th Seanad.

After another unsuccessful candidacy at the 1961 general election, L'Estrange was finally elected to the 18th Dáil for the Longford–Westmeath constituency at the 1965 election, and was re-elected at each successive election until he retired from politics at the 1987 general election.

After the 1981 general election, a Fine Gael–Labour Party coalition was returned to office in the 22nd Dáil under Taoiseach Garret FitzGerald. L'Estrange was appointed Minister of State at the Department of the Taoiseach, a position which included the role of Chief Whip.

In 1973, L'Estrange was appointed a member of the second delegation from the Oireachtas to the European Parliament and re-appointed to the third delegation in 1977.

When his party was in Government and was being attacked by Fianna Fáil on the draining of the River Shannon, he is reputed to have replied "If you can suck as well as you can blow, the Shannon will be drained by teatime".

Personal life

He was a noted athlete who competed on the national and local stage in long-distance running. In 1955, he married farmer's daughter Aileen Kellaghan from Ballinriddera, Multyfarnham, County Westmeath. They lived in Killintown, Multyfarnham.

Both L'Estrange and his wife were keen on greyhound racing, owning and training their own dogs.

L'Estrange died on Good Friday, 1996 after a long illness. The then Taoiseach, John Bruton, spoke of a man who "could speak strongly and from a deep conviction and at the same time hold no personal malice towards any of the victims of his eloquence". Maurice Manning recalled a man never "in bad humour or without that smile which usually meant that a practical joke or a good story was on the way".

References

1917 births
1996 deaths
Fine Gael TDs
Members of the 8th Seanad
Members of the 9th Seanad
Members of the 10th Seanad
Members of the 18th Dáil
Members of the 19th Dáil
Members of the 20th Dáil
Members of the 21st Dáil
Members of the 22nd Dáil
Members of the 23rd Dáil
Members of the 24th Dáil
Fine Gael MEPs
MEPs for the Republic of Ireland 1977–1979
MEPs for the Republic of Ireland 1973–1977
Irish farmers
Ministers of State of the 22nd Dáil
Fine Gael senators
Government Chief Whip (Ireland)
People from County Westmeath